Per Göran Greider (born 1959) is a Swedish social democratic journalist, author and poet. Greider's poetry was first published in 1981.

Greider has been the editor in chief of the provincial newspaper Dala-Demokraten since 1999. He is a prominent left-wing advocate in panel discussions on radio (Sveriges Radio) and television (TV4) and in the Swedish public debate at large.

References

1959 births
Living people
Sommar (radio program) hosts
Swedish journalists
Swedish social democrats
20th-century Swedish poets
Swedish newspaper editors
Swedish radio personalities
Swedish television personalities
Swedish political writers
Swedish male poets
20th-century Swedish male writers